The Cheetah Girls 2 (also known as The Cheetah Girls: When In Spain in the working title) is a 2006 American film and the sequel to the Disney Channel Original Movie (DCOM), The Cheetah Girls. Directed by Kenny Ortega, the sequel is about the talented teen quartet who take a whirlwind tour of Spain to pursue their dreams of pop superstardom. Unlike its predecessor, which incorporated karaoke-like musical numbers, The Cheetah Girls 2 turned into more of a musical.

Its premiere received the highest ratings of all Disney Channel Movies at its time, a total of over 8.1 million viewers, beating the premiere ratings of High School Musical (7.7 million), and beating previous highest-rated DCOM record holder, Cadet Kelly (7.8 million), as well as becoming the highest-rated Cheetah Girls film in the trilogy. The film is the eighth-highest-rated Disney Channel Original Movie of all time and was the highest-rated Disney Channel Original Movie of 2006. This is the last film in the series to star Raven-Symoné.

Plot

The movie begins in Manhattan, three years after the first film, where the Cheetah Girls have just completed their junior year and are performing at a Graduation Party for the Manhattan Magnet's Class of 2006 ("The Party's Just Begun").

Later while having a sleep-over/Chinese food night at Galleria's (Raven-Symoné), Chanel (Adrienne Bailon) tells the girls that her mother, Juanita (Lori Anne Alter), is planning a trip to Barcelona, Spain, where they will be visiting Luc (Abel Folk), Juanita's boyfriend. Chanel is bummed and does not want to see Luc, while the other girls are upset about being separated for the summer. Aqua (Kiely Williams) sees a shooting star and the girls make a wish together—to go to Spain with Chanel. At that very moment, a gust of wind flips one of the girl's magazines pages until it comes across an ad for a Barcelona music festival. Galleria enters the Cheetah Girls and the next day, her mother Dorothea (Lynn Whitfield), Juanita, and the Cheetah Girls all decide to travel to Spain together.

When the girls arrive in Barcelona, they do some shopping before resting in a Cafe. Soon they hear a guitar playing and meet Angel (Peter Vives), a mysterious guitar player who accompanies them around Barcelona as they sing to the entire city, and he becomes Galleria's love interest ("Strut").

The next day the girls audition for the festival and earn a spot ("Cheetah Sisters").

At breakfast the following day, they meet Joaquin (Golan Yosef), a count, Luc's godson, a handsome dancer who becomes a love interest for Dorinda (Sabrina Bryan). After Dorinda finds out Joaquin is a dancer, she goes to his studio, where he teaches her tango ("Dance With Me").

That night Joaquin takes the Cheetahs to The Dancing Cat, a local Spanish night club where all of the new artists perform their songs ("Why Wait") ("A La Nanita Nana").

There they meet and befriend Marisol (Belinda), a Spanish pop star, beloved by all of Barcelona, and who will also compete in the Music Festival, and her manager/mother, Lola (Kim Manning). Lola appears nice and wins the Cheetah Girls' affection, but secretly plans a scheme to break up the Cheetah Girls, as they pose a threat to her daughter's chances in the competition. She starts making Marisol take Chanel away from The Cheetah Girls. Meanwhile, Aqua and Dorothea have been designing clothes with Dorothea's old friends, Juanita is trying to get a proposal out of Luc, Dorinda is teaching hip hop to Joaquin's class, and Galleria is the only one focused on the competition, as she is writing a song called, "Amigas Cheetahs", which they will sing at the competition ("Do Your Own Thing").

Galleria notices that everyone is getting involved in other activities except for her ("It's Over"), and eventually decided to take a train to Paris, where she can meet up with her father, Francobollo, and he will take her back home to Manhattan. While at a train station, the other three girls find Galleria and sing the starting sequence of "Amigas Cheetahs", and Galleria says she will only come back if they stay focused. While Chanel walked around the house, she overhears Juanita talking to Dorothea about how she believes that Luc doesn't want to marry her because Chanel doesn't like him. Luc later proposes to Juanita, after Chanel gives him permission, and she gladly accepts. Luc tells Chanel that she can stay in New York with her friends for her upcoming senior year. However, the Cheetah Girls' dreams are in serious trouble. After the Cheetah Girls finish performing at The Dancing Cat ("Step Up"), Lola convinces The Dancing Cat's manager to pay the Cheetah Girls money. The competition will only allow amateur performs to compete. Accepting payment from The Dancing Cat makes the Cheetah Girls professional performers, but they gave the money back and Angel, who was present during the entire exchange, investigates.

Lola suggests that since the Cheetah Girls cannot perform as a group, Chanel should perform with Marisol instead since they can both sing in Spanish. Right before Chanel is going to get changed to perform with Marisol, the Festival Director informs that the Cheetah Girls are able to perform after getting a tip. Everyone is surprised when they see that the informer was his nephew, Angel. He informed that Lola tried to sabotage the Cheetahs, and his uncle reinstates the girls as the Cheetah Girls. Lola tries to dispute, but the Director will not hear it. Marisol finally tells off her mother, saying she is quitting the competition because she loves to sing and not to be famous, and her mother is just desperate to make her a star. The Cheetah Girls then perform "Amigas Cheetahs", and as a surprise, bring Marisol onto the stage (where Lola sees how happy her daughter finally is), along with Joaquin's dancing crew, Angel on the guitar and the Director on the trumpet. Their song is a hit with the crowd. An alternate ending concludes after this, where Juanita and Luc are having their wedding, and with everybody enjoying themselves ("Cherish the Moment"). This scene is not shown in both TV or sing-along versions.

Cast
 Raven-Symoné as Galleria "Bubbles" Garibaldi
 Adrienne Bailon as Chanel "Chuchie" Simmons
 Sabrina Bryan as Dorinda "Do" Thomas
 Kiely Williams as Aquanette "Aqua" Walker
 Belinda as Marisol Durán
 Kim Manning as Lola Durán, Marisol's mother and manager, and the main antagonist of the film. She plans to break up the Cheetah Girls in order to ensure that her daughter wins the competition and becomes a star. In the end, she also befriends the Cheetah Girls.
 Lynn Whitfield as Dorothea Garibaldi
 Lori Alter as Juanita Simmons
 Golan Yosef as Joaquin, Dorinda's love interest. Like Dorinda, he is a talented dancer.
 Peter Vives as Angel, a mysterious guitar player and new Galleria's love interest.
 Abel Folk as Luc, Juanita's fiance-then-husband, Joaquin's godfather, and Chanel's stepfather.

Production
The entire film, including the scenes that took place in New York City, was shot on location in Barcelona, Spain during the spring of 2006.

Soundtrack

The soundtrack was released on August 15, 2006.<ref>The Cheetah Girls 2</ref> It debuted at #5 on the Billboard 200 and sold over 1.4 million copies to date.

Track listing
 "The Party's Just Begun" – The Cheetah Girls
 "Strut" – The Cheetah Girls featuring Peter Vives and Jorge Juan Garzón
 "Dance With Me" – Drew Seeley featuring Belinda
 "Why Wait?" – Belinda
 "A La Nanita Nana" – Adrienne Bailon and Belinda
 "Do Your Own Thing" – Raven-Symoné
 "It's Over" – The Cheetah Girls
 "Step Up" – The Cheetah Girls
 "Amigas Cheetahs" – The Cheetah Girls featuring Belinda
 "Cherish the Moment" – The Cheetah Girls
 "Cheetah Sisters (Barcelona Mix)" – The Cheetah Girls
 "Everyone's a Star" – Raven-Symoné
 "It's Gonna Be Alright" – Raven-Symoné
 "Studio Session with The Cheetah Girls" – Bonus video track
 
Special editions
Bonus tracks
 "Route 66" – The Cheetah Girls
 "Strut (Ming Mix)" – The Cheetah Girls

Disneyland concert DVD tracksAll songs performed by the Cheetah Girls "The Party's Just Begun"
 "Step Up"
 "Cinderella"
 "Strut"
 "Cheetah Sisters"

Reception

The premiere of the movie became Disney Channel's highest-rated Disney Channel Original Movie with a total of 8.1 million viewers, beating the previous record holder Cadet Kelly, which had a total of 7.8 million viewers. This was then beat by Jump In!, which closely beat it with 8.2 million viewers. Currently, the highest-rated DCOM is High School Musical 2 with 17.2 million viewers. A repeat during the weekend gathered a massive 7.82 million viewers, tallying the total number of viewers to 15.9 million viewers. The Cheetah Girls 2 is currently the sixth-highest-viewed DCOM as of September 2010. It was the highest-viewed DCOM of 2006, following the footsteps of the first film, which was the highest-viewed of 2003. Feedback to the movie has been generally positive for the target audience.

Ultimate Disney said "this film lays off on some of the annoyances found in the first film. The Cheetah Girls have grown up and thus grown out of the annoying tweenage girl characterizations that are now seen in the snobby minor characters of Hannah Montana". The review went on to say "the nicest thing about this sequel is that on screen, the Cheetah Girls still seem to exemplify a deep friendship among a group of young women. The chemistry between the central actresses is strong, making them a believable group of friends who appear to be having a lot of fun making this movie".

About.com was also favourable, commenting "The Cheetah Girls 2 contains the expected cheesiness, drama, and unrealistic plot, but I have to admit that I was totally taken in". Common Sense Media wrote that "the characters have aged, and their flair for drama has taken a backseat to introspective decision making and goal setting, making them more realistic (and positive) role models".

In the United Kingdom, 282,000 viewers tuned in on its premiere night, becoming #1 of the week on Disney Channel UK.

Release

DVD release
 The Cheetah Girls 2: Cheetah-Licious Edition was released on November 28, 2006. The Region 1 DVD includes Spanish audio tracks.
 The Cheetah Girls 2 – As Feras da Música DVD was released in Brazil on April 11, 2007.
 The Cheetah Girls 2: Cheetah-Licious Edition DVD was released in the UK on May 21, 2007.
 The Cheetah Girls 2 DVD was released in Italy on May 23, 2007, with audio tracks in Italian, German, English, Spanish and French and with extra features.
 The Cheetah Girls 2: Cheetah-Licious Edition DVD was released in Hong Kong on June 26, 2007. The Region 3 DVD includes audio tracks in English, Mandarin, Japanese, Spanish and Portuguese, and subtitles in English, Traditional Chinese, Malay, Indonesian, Spanish, and Portuguese.

The DVD debuted at #10 on Billboard''s "Top DVD sales" chart in the U.S., where it has sold nearly one million copies since its release and has grossed over $17 million in revenue. The Cheetah Girls 2 (2006) - Financial Information

Awards
 2007 – Nominated; Imagen Awards Imagen Award for Best Director – Film (Kenny Ortega)
 2007 – Nominated; Motion Picture Sound Editors Golden Reel Award for Best Sound Editing in Music for Television – Long Form (Carli Barber; music editor)

References

External links
 
 
 

2006 television films
2006 films
2006 comedy-drama films
2006 in American television
2000s buddy comedy films
2000s female buddy films
2000s musical comedy-drama films
2000s teen comedy-drama films
American buddy comedy-drama films
American female buddy films
American musical comedy-drama films
American sequel films
American teen comedy-drama films
American teen musical films
The Cheetah Girls films
Comedy-drama television films
Films about girl groups
Films about orphans
Films based on American novels
Films based on young adult literature
Films directed by Kenny Ortega
Films set in Barcelona
Films set in New York City
Films shot in Barcelona
Musical television films
2000s Spanish-language films
Television sequel films
2000s English-language films
2000s American films